Michael Melville Colborne LVO (20 January 1934 – 21 September 2017) was born in Epsom, Surrey and attended school at Dorking County Grammar School. was  a Royal Navy officer and private secretary to Charles, Prince of Wales, and later the Duke of Westminster.

References 

People from Carshalton
English courtiers
Royal Navy officers
People educated at Dorking Grammar School
Lieutenants of the Royal Victorian Order
1934 births
2017 deaths